Ama de-Graft Aikins is a British-Ghanaian Social Psychologist who is currently a British Academy Global Professor at University College London's Institute of Advanced Studies.  Her research focuses primarily on the psychosocial and structural drivers of Africa's chronic non-communicable disease burden, but she also has interests in arts and health, and the history of psychology in Africa and its intersections with critical theory and African Studies. She has held teaching and research positions at the University of Cambridge, London School of Economics and Political Science and the University of Ghana. In 2015, she became the first female full professor of psychology at the University of Ghana, where she has a tenured position.

Early life and education 
Ama de-Graft Aikins was born in London to Ghanaian parents. She had her secondary school education at Wesley Girls High School, Cape Coast, Ghana and South Thames College, London. After a first degree in Pharmacology at the University of Manchester, she switched disciplines and completed a conversion masters degree in psychology at Manchester Metropolitan University.She received her doctorate degree (PhD) in Social Psychology from the London School of Economics and Political Science, and completed her postdoctoral training at the University of Cambridge.

Research 
Ama de-Graft Aikins has led, and collaborated on, interdisciplinary non-communicable disease (NCD) research projects based in Africa and Europe, including the UK-Africa Academic Partnership on Chronic Disease and the RODAM Project. She is currently Principal Investigator of the Chronicity and Care in African Contexts Project, which is funded as part of her British Academy Global Professorship Award. The project aims to explore how social responses to chronic conditions can shape public engagement and intervention models for chronic care in African communities on the continent and in the diaspora.

Ama de-Graft Aikins has consulted on NCDs, health and health systems for the Ghana’s Ministry of Health, West African Health Organization (WAHO) and the World Health Organization (WHO).

She serves on several boards and advisory groups, including the board of Partnership for African Social Governance Research (PASGR), the Independent Advisory Board of PEBL West Africa, and the Scientific Advisory Board of the World Pandemic Research Network.

Selected publications 
Ama de-Graft Aikins has published on chronic illness representations and experiences in Ghanaian communities and on Africa’s NCD burden, and she has (co)edited journal and book volumes on these themes. Her work has been featured in the UK Guardian, the Global Journal, British Medical Journal and Lancet Psychiatry.

Selected publications include:

 de-Graft Aikins, A (2021). A too familiar threat. New Scientist, 3327, 27 March2021https://doi.org/10.1016/S0262-4079(21)00514-5
 de-Graft Aikins, A. (2020). ‘Colonial virus’? Creative arts and public understanding of COVID-19 in Ghana. Journal of the British Academy, Vol 8, 401 - 413. https://doi.org/10.5871/jba%2F008.401
 de-Graft Aikins, A, Dodoo, F., Awuah, R.B., Owusu-Dabo, E., Addo, J et al. (2019) Knowledge and perceptions of type 2 diabetes among Ghanaian migrants in three European countries and Ghanaians in rural and urban Ghana: the RODAM qualitative study. PLOS ONE 14(4): e0214501.https://doi.org/10.1371/journal.pone.0214501
Sanuade, O., Dodoo, F., Koram, K., de-Graft Aikins, A. (2019). Explanatory Models of Stroke in Ghana: Perspectives of Stroke Survivors and their Caregivers. Ethnicity and Health.https://doi.org/10.1080/13557858.2018.1557116
Boatemaa, S., Badasu, D., and de-Graft Aikins, A. (2018). Food beliefs and practices in urban poor communities in Accra: implications for diet and health interventions. BMC Public Health.18:434, https://doi.org/10.1186/s12889-018-5336-6
Sanuade, O.A., Ayettey, H., Hewlett, S., Dedey, F., Wu, L., Akingbola, T., Ogedegbe, G., and de-Graft Aikins, A. (2018) Understanding the causes of breast cancer treatment delays at a teaching hospital in Ghana. Journal of Health Psychology. https://doi.org/10.1177/1359105318814152 
Baatiema, L., de-Graft Aikins, A., Sav, A., Mnatzaganian, G., Chan, C.K., Somerset, S. (2017) Barriers to evidence-based acute stroke care in Ghana: a qualitative study on the perspectives of stroke care professionals. BMJ Open 2017;7:e015385. doi:10.1136/ bmjopen-2016-015385
 de-Graft Aikins, A. (2015). Mental illness and destitution in Ghana: a social psychological perspective. In Emmanuel Akyeampong, Alan Hill and Arthur Kleinman. (Eds). The Culture of Mental Illness and Psychiatric Practice in Africa. Bloomington: Indiana University Press. (pages 112-143) https://www.researchgate.net/publication/282661666_Mental_illness_and_destitution_in_Ghana_A_social_psychological_perspective
 de-Graft Aikins, A., Kushitor, M., Koram, K., Gyamfi, S., Ogedegbe. G. (2014). Chronic non-communicable diseases and the challenge of universal health coverage. Insights from community-based cardiovascular disease research in urban poor communities in Accra, Ghana. BMC Public Health. 14 (Suppl 2), doi:10.1186/1471-2458-14-S2-S3.
 Awuah, R.B., Anarfi, J.K., Agyemang, C., Ogedegbe, G. and de-Graft Aikins, A. (2014) Prevalence, awareness, treatment and control of hypertension in urban poor communities in Accra, Ghana. Journal of Hypertension. 32(6), 1203-10. doi: 10.1097/HJH.0000000000000165
 Agyei-Mensah, S. and de-Graft Aikins, A. (2010). Epidemiological transition and the double burden of disease in Accra, Ghana. Journal of Urban Health, 87 (5), 879-897 https://doi.org/10.1007/s11524-010-9492-y
 de-Graft Aikins, A., Unwin, N., Agyemang, C. Allotey, P., Campbell, C and Arhinful, D.K. (2010). Tackling Africa’s Chronic Disease Burden: from the local to the global. Globalization and Health, 6:5. https://doi.org/10.1186/1744-8603-6-5
 de-Graft Aikins, A. (2005). Healer-shopping in Africa: new evidence from a rural-urban qualitative study of Ghanaian diabetes experiences. British Medical Journal, 331, 737. https://doi.org/10.1136/bmj.331.7519.737

Books 

 de-Graft Aikins, A and Agyemang, C. (Eds) (2016). Chronic non-communicable diseases in low and middle income countries. Oxon: CABI Publishers
 Agyemang, C and de-Graft Aikins, A. (Eds). (2014). Culture, Ethnicity and Chronic Conditions: A Global Synthesis. London: Routledge/Taylor and Francis Group.
 de-Graft Aikins, A., Agyei-Mensah, S., Agyemang, C. (Eds). (2013) Ghana’s Chronic Non-communicable disease burden: multidisciplinary perspectives. Accra: Sub Saharan Publishers

Awards and honors 
In 2019, Ama de-Graft Aikins was inducted as an international member of the US National Academy of Medicine.  Her citation read: “For research that contributed to the development of unique interdisciplinary models to address Africa’s chronic non-communicable disease burden”
Other awards and honours include:

 Fellow, Ghana Academy of Arts and Sciences, 2016
 LSE African Initiative Fellow, 2013
Aspen Ideas Festival Scholar, 2009 (Nominated by the African Leadership Initiative (ALI))
Economic and Social Research Council (ESRC) Postdoctoral Fellow, 2005 - 2006

References

External links 
 Ama de-Graft Aikins Research
Chronic Conditions: Knowing, Seeing & Healing the Body in Global Africa 
Health, Disease and Healthcare in Africa
Inaugural Lecture by Prof Ama de-Graft Aikins
 
Iris Profile
British Academy Global Professorship Announcement 
Unravelling the complexities of chronic illness experiences in Africa communities

Living people
Alumni of the London School of Economics
Academic staff of the University of Ghana
Year of birth missing (living people)
21st-century British psychologists
Alumni of the University of Cambridge
Alumni of the University of Manchester
Social psychologists
British psychologists
British women psychologists
Ghanaian psychologists